Westhill Central Schools is a public school district immediately adjacent to the city of Syracuse, New York, USA, serving students primarily in the Town of Geddes and Town of Onondaga.

The district is irregularly shaped with two large areas served joined by a narrow connection, as in the shape of an hourglass.  The word Westhill is conjunction of the names of the two principal areas served: Westvale, a neighborhood comprising about half of the Town of Geddes, and Onondaga Hill a neighborhood comprising a sizable portion of the Town of Onondaga.

Schools
 Westhill Senior High School (Grades 9–12) 
 Onondaga Hill Middle School (Grades 5–8) 
 Cherry Road School (Grades 2–4)
 Walberta Park Primary School (Grades K-1)

Walberta Park Primary School

Staff
Principal: Beth Kramer
Beginning in the 2013–2014 school year, Mrs. Beth Kramer became the principal of Walberta Park. Prior to that, the principal was Mrs. Maureen Mulderig.

Cherry Road Elementary School

Staff
Principal: Jeremy Augie
Starting in the 2021–22 school year, former Westhill teacher, Mr. Jeremie Augie took over the position of Cherry Road Principal. Before this Mr. Brett King held the position.

Onondaga Hill Middle School

Staff
Principal: Mark Bednarski
Vice Principal: Kathryn Ta

Westhill Senior High School

Staff
Principal: Lee Roscoe
Vice Principal: Starting 2017-2018: Daniel Dolan, Prior to then Marietta Lachenauer

References

External links

School districts in New York (state)
Education in Onondaga County, New York
School districts established in 1960
1960 establishments in New York (state)